The FIVB Volleyball Women's U21 World Championship is the world championship of volleyball for female players under the age of 21 organized by Fédération Internationale de Volleyball (FIVB).

The first tournament was staged in 1977 in Brazil. The second and third tournaments were played at intervals of four years, in 1981 and 1985; with the fourth tournament in 1987 the interval became, and remains, two years. The most recent tournament was jointly hosted by Netherlands and Belgium and won by Italy.

In March 2022, FIVB decides to change the age category of the tournament by moving it from U20 to U21 in order to equate it with the Men's U21 World Championship.

Brazil is the most successful nation in the tournament's history, with six titles and five runners-up. China is the second most successful with three titles and three runners-up.

A corresponding tournament for male players is the FIVB Volleyball Men's U21 World Championship.

Results summary

Medal table

Appearance

Legend
 – Champions
 – Runners-up
 – Third place
 – Fourth place
 – Did not enter / Did not qualify
 – Hosts
Q – Qualified for forthcoming tournament

MVP by edition

1977–81 – Not awarded
1985 – 
1987 – 
1989–91 – Not awarded
1993 – 
1995 – 
1997 – Not awarded
1999 – 
2001 – 

2003 – Not awarded
2005 – 
2007 – 
2009 – 
2011 – 
2013 – 
2015 – 
2017 – 
2019 – 
2021 –

See also

 FIVB Volleyball Men's U21 World Championship
 FIVB Volleyball Women's World Championship
 FIVB Volleyball Women's U23 World Championship
 FIVB Volleyball Girls' U19 World Championship

References

External links
 FIVB  Women's Junior Volleyball World Championship Honours

 
International women's volleyball competitions
Volleyball
Youth volleyball
Biennial sporting events
Recurring sporting events established in 1977